Laïd Bessou (born 5 February 1976) is a retired Algerian runner who specialized in the men's 3000 metres steeplechase. He competed in the men's 3000 metres steeplechase at the 2000 Summer Olympics.

Achievements

Personal bests
1500 metres – 3:38.79 min (2000)
3000 metres steeplechase – 8:10.23  min (2000) NR

References

External links

1976 births
Living people
Algerian male long-distance runners
Algerian male middle-distance runners
Algerian male steeplechase runners
Athletes (track and field) at the 2000 Summer Olympics
Olympic athletes of Algeria
Mediterranean Games bronze medalists for Algeria
Mediterranean Games medalists in athletics
Athletes (track and field) at the 2001 Mediterranean Games
21st-century Algerian people
20th-century Algerian people